is a Japanese actor and comedian.

Filmography

Film
 Zatoichi and the One-Armed Swordsman (1971)
 Lupin III: Strange Psychokinetic Strategy (1974)
 Princess from the Moon (1987)
 A Taxing Woman (1987)
 Minbo (1992)
 Nin x Nin: Ninja Hattori-kun, the Movie (2004) as Jinzo Hattori
 The Uchōten Hotel (2006)
 Talk Talk Talk (2007)
 Tsukiji Uogashi Sandaime (2008)
 The Hovering Blade (2009)
 The Hikita's Are Expecting! (2019)
 The Woman of S.R.I. the Movie (2021)

Television
 Ten to Chi to (1969)
 Oshin (1983–84) as Tanimura Sakuzo
 Hōjō Tokimune (2001) as Hōjō Masamura
 Okashina Keiji (2003-Now) (Lead role)
 Shinsengumi! (2004) 
 Saka no Ue no Kumo (2009)
 Onihei Hankachō as Amabiki no Bungorō (2009)
 Fumō Chitai (2009) as Seizo Hisamatsu
 Taira no Kiyomori (2012) as Emperor Shirakawa
 Doctor-X: Surgeon Michiko Daimon (2012)
 Taiga Drama ga Umareta Hi (2023)

Variety shows
 Ito Family (1997–2007)
 IQ Sapuri (2004–2009)
 Gaki no Tsukai (Youth High School, New Years Special) (2020)

References

External links
NHKアーカイブ　Actor Shirō Itō
Shirō Itō official site

1937 births
Japanese male film actors
Japanese male television actors
20th-century Japanese male actors
Japanese male stage actors
Living people